This is a list of radio stations in the United Kingdom.

National analogue and digital (DAB) stations 
This list does not include stations which broadcast on numerous local digital multiplexes or MW licences to achieve near-national coverage.

DAB frequencies:
 11A - radio stations operated under the Sound Digital multiplex
 11D / 12A - radio stations operated under the Digital One multiplex, 12A in Scotland and 11D in the rest of the UK
 12B - radio stations operated under the BBC National DAB multiplex

National digital (DAB+) stations 
List of stations on the Digital One and Sound Digital multiplexes broadcasting in the newer DAB+ Digital Radio standard

DAB frequencies:
 11A - radio stations operated under the Sound Digital multiplex
 11D / 12A - radio stations operated under the Digital One multiplex, 12A in Scotland and 11D in the rest of the UK

Semi-national analogue and digital (DAB) stations 

Stations which are available nationally on Freeview and/or satellite and/or broadcast on more than one local DAB multiplex:

Local and regional analogue and digital (DAB) stations 
Local radio stations from the BBC, in England:

BBC Local Radio

BBC Nations Radio 
BBC radio stations from Scotland, Wales and Northern Ireland, broadcast in their respective areas via analogue and digital radio, Freeview and across the whole UK on satellite and cable television:

Local commercial radio

England 
England's radio stations adhere to the statistical regions of East Midlands, East, Greater London, Greater Manchester, North East, North West, South East, South West, West Midlands and Yorkshire and the Humber.

Former English stations 

This list details radio stations which have lost their licence to broadcast or have closed down due to financial reasons.

Northern Ireland

Former Northern Ireland stations

Scotland

Former Scottish stations

Wales

Former Welsh stations

The Channel Islands and the Isle of Man 

Although the Channel Islands and the Isle of Man are not part of the UK they are served by the UK's national radio stations. Additionally services in the Channel Islands are licensed by the UK's regulator, Ofcom.  Services in the Isle of Man are not licensed by a UK regulator but rather by the Broadcasting Act 1990 of Tynwald

Community radio stations

Former community radio stations 
The followed stations have closed down and returned their licences to Ofcom

Small scale DAB multiplexes 
Permanent small scale multiplexes licensed by OFCOM

Small scale trial DAB multiplexes 
Small scale multiplexes licensed by OFCOM for a trial period allowing a "more affordable way for smaller stations to broadcast on DAB digital radio":

RSL stations 

Temporary Restricted Service Licence stations are licensed by Ofcom and broadcast for up to 28 days. RSLs are used for a number of purposes including coverage of events and festivals, trial broadcasts by groups aiming to launch a full-time service, student radio and training projects and religious festivals including the Sikh festival Vaisakhi, the Muslim month of Ramadan, Jehovah's Witness conventions and Christian events such as Easter and Christmas.

The following list is a small selection of regular RSL stations which have been set up to cover various festivals and events across the UK:

Student and schools radio 
Most universities plus a number of schools and colleges operate student radio stations with the vast majority only available online. The Student Radio Association represents around 65 student stations.

The following stations are available via an FM community licence or via LPAM and LPFM transmitters:

Hospital radio stations 

Typically available within the grounds of a single hospital, these stations broadcast to bedside units and occasionally public areas of the hospital. Hospital radio is free of charge on bedside entertainment systems operated by Hospedia and Premier Bedside and an increasing number of stations are available online.

Around 200 stations are supported by the Hospital Broadcasting Association (HBA).

The following stations are available via LPAM or LPFM transmitters or as Ofcom licensed community stations:

Satellite radio stations 

Stations which are broadcast to the UK via satellite:

LPAM, LPFM and other stations

Frequencies 
To conserve space in the listings, the waveband has not been listed after each frequency, but they are easy to tell apart.
 Whole numbers always refer to a kHz (AM) frequency - i.e. 999 = 999 kHz.
 Decimal numbers always refer to a MHz (FM) frequency - i.e. 96.2 = 96.2 MHz.
 A number and letter combination refers to a DAB channel - i.e. 12C = frequency block 12C on 227.360 MHz.

See also 
 Radio in the UK
 Digital radio in the UK
 Radio in the Republic of Ireland
 List of British television channels
 List of Celtic-language media

References

External links 
 Radioplayer UK – Radio streaming service owned by the BBC, Global Radio, Bauer Media Group and RadioCentre
 LiveRadio UK - Comprehensive list of UK radio stations